The 2013 La Route de France was an Elite Women's road  race, rated at 2.1 by the UCI, which ran from 3 August to 10 August covering approximately 831.8 km. The race was won overall by Linda Villumsen of Wiggle–Honda, marking her first overall win for the new British based team. The race is also noted due to the record breaking efforts of Villumsen's teammate, Giorgia Bronzini who won six consecutive stages (1 – 6) breaking the all-time record for consecutive stage wins in a women's stage racing. The Wiggle–Honda team won all seven of the road stages, with Emma Johansson of Orica–AIS winning the prologue earlier in the race.

Stages

Prologue
3 August 2013 – Soissons to Soissons,

Stage 1
4 August 2013 – Soissons to Enghien les Bains,

Stage 2
5 August 2013 – Enghien les Bains to Mantes la Jolie,

Stage 3
6 August 2013 – Anet to Mamers,

Stage 4
7 August 2013 – Cloyes sur le Loir to Briare,

Stage 5
8 August 2013 – Saint-Fargeau to Pouges les Eaux,

Stage 6
9 August 2013 – Pouges les Eaux to Vichy,

Stage 7
10 August 2013 – Cusset to Chauffailles,

Classification leadership

References

La Route de France
2013 in women's road cycling
2013 in French sport